Shithead (also known by many other names, most commonly Karma, Palace and Shed) is a card game, the object of which is to lose all of one's playing cards, with the final player being the "shithead". The game became popular among backpackers in the late 20th century. Although the basic structure of the game generally remains constant, there are regional variations to the game's original rules.

Setup
From a standard, shuffled deck of cards, each player is dealt 9 cards in total: 3 face-down cards in a row (blind cards), 3 face-up cards on top of the blind cards, and 3 hand cards. The blind cards will be the last cards to be played and players are not allowed to see or change these cards until the ending turns of the game. The face-up will be the second to last set of cards to be played in the game (before the blind cards). At the beginning of the game, players are allowed to switch their hand cards with their face-up cards in an attempt to produce a strong set of face-up cards (possibly all perfect wildcards) for later in the game. Cards with the same numerical value can be stacked on top of each other if needed.

Gameplay
The starting player is the first person to have been dealt a 3 as face-up card. If no player was dealt such a card, then the first player to announce that they have a 3 in hand starts. (If no player has a 3, then the game is started by the person who was dealt a 4; if no 4, then a 5, and so on.) The second player must then place an equal or higher card (in numerical value) than the card played previously, this card is to be put on top of the starting card to form the discard pile. All subsequent players follow this rule. 

Each player should have at least 3 cards in their hand at all times and a after placing a card down draws another card from the deck - until the deck runs out of cards. The game continues sequentially in a clockwise direction. Depending on the rules agreed to at the outset, certain wildcards like Jokers will reverse the direction of play.

Aces are the highest card in the deck, trumped only by a wild card. Twos and tens are wildcards, and can be played on any card. Any card can be played to follow a two. When a ten is played, the discard pile is immediately "burned" (removed from play and set aside for the remainder of the game). The same player then takes another turn, playing any card or set to begin a new discard pile.

If a player is able to place four cards with the same numerical value (e.g.  or ), this burns the discards in the same manner as a ten. The player who burns the discard pile must then play another card.

When a player has no wildcards and no single card that is equal or higher in value than the card on top of the play pile, they must pick up all the cards on the play pile and end their turn. Picking up the pile can often put a player at a great disadvantage when many cards have been played, as they will have more cards to shed than other players. Even so, it is still possible to quickly recover from this handicap by burning the pile.

After a player has no more cards in their hand, and the deck is empty, they need to play from their three face-up cards. They cannot play from this set of cards until they have finished with their hand. Following the rule: the value of the face-up card must be higher than the value of the card on the top of the pile, if a player cannot play the face-up card, then they must pick up the pile. Once all of the face-up cards have been played, a player must then play their blind cards. These cards are played one at a time, without the player knowing the card until the moment it is played. As usual, if the chosen card is lower than the previous card played, they need to pick up the pile, and are required to play their entire hand again before progressing to the rest of their face-down cards.

When a player has no cards left, they are out. The game progresses until only one player is left, at which point they are crowned the "shithead". Under most rules, the shithead's only role is to deal the next set of cards, but players may decide further punishments for the role, such as fetching the next round of drinks, or wearing a brown paper bag on their head until the next player takes the role.

Alternative rules
Two Jokers can be added to the deck as additional wildcards. This expanded deck allows the game to be played by six players.

Many rule sets and house rules give special attributes to other card values, such as reversing the order of play, skipping a player's turn, or needing the next play to be lower than the played card. A common rule is to have one rank considered "transparent", "invisible" or "glass", the next card played having to beat the one below the transparent card.

Some versions of the game do not allow 10s to be played onto face cards, and allow the player who played the 10 to take another turn immediately. Others have a certain rank as a wild card where any card may be played onto it.

Another variation, which allows up to 10 players, involves playing with two decks shuffled together. Cards that match the card at the top of the stack in both value and suit can be played from a player's hand out-of-sequence, with play then continuing on from that player.

References

American card games
Beating games
Two-player card games
Year of introduction missing